Margaret DePriest (born April 19, 1931)  is a retired American actress and daytime serial writer. She was nominated for 5 Daytime Emmy Award awards for her writing and in 1965 won an Obie Award for Best Actress for her performance in The Place for Chance.

Life and career
She began her career as an actress both onstage and on television.  Her acting credits include a contract role as Abby Cameron #1 on The Edge of Night from 1965 to 1966.   She also played social worker Mrs. Berger on the NBC serial The Doctors.

In the mid-1960s, she began writing The Edge of Night. In 1969, she co-created and was co-head writer of CBS Daytime's Where the Heart Is.

She has served as head writer for several serials, including General Hospital, Days of Our Lives, All My Children, Another World, One Life to Live, and Sunset Beach.

She is married to writer Paul Price.

Positions held

The Doctors
 Head writer: February – September 1976

All My Children
 Head writer: 1989

Another World
 Head writer: March 1986 - January 1988, May 1996 - January 1997

Days of Our Lives
 Associate head writer: October 21, 1981 - April 19, 1982
 Head writer: April 20, 1982 - September 21, 1984
 Co-head writer (with Sheri Anderson and Thom Racina): September 24 - October 25, 1984

General Hospital
 Co-head writer (with Pat Falken Smith): 1980 - 1981

The Edge of Night
 Co-head writer (with Lou Scofield): mid-1960s

One Life to Live
 Associate head writer: 1990 - 1991

Sunset Beach
 Co-head writer with Christopher Whitesell: August 1998 - December 1999

Where the Heart Is
 Co-Creator (with Lou Scofield)
 Co-head writer (with Lou Scofield): 1969 - 1970

Awards and nominations
Daytime Emmy Award
Nomination, 1992, Best Writing, One Life to Live
Nomination, 1990, Best Writing, All My Children
Nomination, 1985, Best Writing, Days of our Lives
Nomination, 1984, Best Writing, Days of our Lives
Nomination, 1985, Best Writing, General Hospital

Writers Guild of America Award
Nomination, 1998, Best Writing, Another World

References

External links

1931 births
Living people
American soap opera writers
American women television writers
Women soap opera writers
20th-century American screenwriters
20th-century American women writers
American stage actresses
20th-century American actresses
21st-century American women